The Conveyor of Death is a 1933 Soviet film directed by Ivan Pyryev.

Plot 
The film tells about three friends who, as a result of the economic crisis, lose their jobs. This destroys their dreams of a happy life.

Starring 
 Ada Vojtsik as Luisa
 Veronika Polonskaya as Eleonora
 Tamara Makarova as Anni
 Vladimir Shakhovskoy as Dick
 Pyotr Savin as Kristi - postman
 Vladimir Chernyavsky as Avgust Kroon
 Ivan Bobrov as Max
 Mikhail Bolduman as Kurt
 Mikhail Astangov as Prince Sumbatov
 Aleksandr Chistyakov as Kashevskiy - master

References

External links 

1933 films
1930s Russian-language films
Soviet black-and-white films
1933 drama films
Soviet drama films